The Bârz is a left tributary of the river Nera in Romania. It discharges into the Nera near the village Bârz.

References

Rivers of Romania
Rivers of Caraș-Severin County